Henry Every was an English pirate.

Henry Every may also refer to:

Sir Henry Every, 2nd Baronet (1629–1700), of the Every baronets
Sir Henry Every, 3rd Baronet (1653–1709), of the Every baronets
Sir Henry Every, 6th Baronet (1708–1755), of the Every baronets
Sir Henry Every, 9th Baronet (1777–1855), of the Every baronets
Sir Henry Flower Every, 10th Baronet (1830–1893), of the Every baronets
Sir Henry John Michael Every, 13th Baronet (born 1947), of the Every baronets

See also
Every (surname)